U R Man is South Korean boy band SS501's fifth Korean mini-album and the unofficial debut album of Double S 301, (credited then as SS501 Special Project Group.) It released on November 21, 2008 by DSP Media and published by MNET media. It is the only SS501 album not to feature members Park Jung-min and Kim Hyun-joong.

With Kim Hyun-joong busy filming with Boys Over Flowers, and Park Jung Min with his musical debut in Grease as "Danny Park", the remaining three members formed 'SS501 Project Group' with Heo Young-saeng as the leader. They released a project album named U R Man in November 2008, with a high tempo dance track "U R Man", which the three remaining SS501 members promoted by themselves, with the exception of some special performances that included all five band members. The project group also performed "U R Man" in episode four of Boys Over Flowers, where they appeared for a cameo performance.

In addition with the title track, "U R Man", the album also includes the members' first solo songs: "Is It Love?", "Never Let You Go", and "I Am".

In March 2009, SS501 released a limited edition album in Japan, which comes with four additional tracks not included in the Korea version.

Track listing

Music videos
 "U R Man"

Release history

References

External links

 
 

SS501 albums
2008 EPs